Jīng (Wade–Giles: ching1) is the Chinese word for "essence", specifically kidney essence. Along with qì and shén, it is considered one of the Three Treasures (Sanbao ) of traditional Chinese medicine or TCM.

Description

According to Traditional Chinese Medical theory, Jīng or Essence can be summarised in two parts: the Yin, being congenital or prenatal, and the Yang, being postnatal or acquired. Prenatal Jing is acquired at birth from the parents: the father's sperm and the mother's ovum. This is a similar concept to DNA. Postnatal Jing is acquired after birth through food, water, oxygen, as well as environmental and social conditions—very much like the concept of epigenetics. The concept is expounded in the Taoist cosmological Bagua. 

The Yin and Yang Jing transform to create and replenish each other. The Yang Jing circulates through the eight extraordinary vessels and transforms to become and replenish yin; in turn the marrow becomes blood, body fluid and semen.

Jīng (essence) should not be confused with the related concept of jìn (power), nor with jīng (classic/warp), which appears in many early Chinese book titles, such as the Nèi Jīng, yì jīng and Chá Jīng, the fundamental text on all the knowledge associated with tea.

The characteristics which constitute signs of good Jing (e.g. facial structure, teeth, hair, strength of adrenals or kidneys) share the embryological origin of neural crest cells. These cells undergo immense and challenging cellular migrations requiring great organisation. As such, Jing may simply represent the strength of embryological self-organisation in the organism. This will be manifested most strongly in those cells which require most organisation; that is, the neural crest cells.

Allocation
One is said to be born with a fixed amount of jīng (prenatal jīng is sometimes called yuanqi) and also can acquire jīng from food and various forms of stimulation (exercise, study, meditation.)

Theoretically, jīng is consumed continuously in life; by everyday stress, illness, substance abuse, sexual intemperance, etc.

Prenatal jīng is very difficult to be renewed, and it is said it is completely consumed upon dying.

Restoration
Jīng is therefore considered quite important for longevity in traditional Chinese medicine (TCM); many disciplines related to qìgōng are devoted to the replenishment of "lost" jīng by restoration of the post-natal jīng and transformation of Shen. In particular, the internal martial arts T'ai chi ch'uan, the Circle Walking of Baguazhang and the middle path of Wuxingheqidao may be used to preserve pre-natal jīng and build post-natal jīng, if performed correctly. Ginseng, particularly Korean and Chinese, is said to bolster the jīng.

An early mention of the term in this sense is in a 4th-century BCE chapter called Neiye "Inner Training" of a larger text compiled during the Han dynasty, the Guǎnzi.

See also
Traditional Chinese Medicine
Dantian
TCM model of the body
Triple burner
Yuan qi
Shen
Glossary of alternative medicine

References

Further references
 Chang, Stephen T. The Great Tao; Tao Longevity;  Stephen T. Chang
 Kaptchuck, Ted J., The Web That Has No Weaver; Congdon & Weed; 
 Maciocia, Giovanni, The Foundations of Chinese Medicine: A Comprehensive Text for Acupuncturists and Herbalists; Churchill Livingstone; 
 Ni, Mao-Shing, The Yellow Emperor's Classic of Medicine : A New Translation of the Neijing Suwen with Commentary; Shambhala, 1995; 
 Holland, Alex Voices of Qi: An Introductory Guide to Traditional Chinese Medicine; North Atlantic Books, 2000; 
 Unschuld, Paul U., Medicine in China: A History of Ideas; University of California Press, 1985; 
 Graham, A.C. Disputers of the Tao: Philosophical Argument in Ancient China (Open Court, 1993). 
 Scheid, Volker, Chinese Medicine in Contemporary China: Plurality and Synthesis; Duke University Press, 2002; 
 Porkert, Manfred The Theoretical Foundations of Chinese Medicine MIT Press, 1974 
 Hongyi, L., Hua, T., Jiming, H., Lianxin, C., Nai, L., Weiya, X., Wentao, M. (2003) Perivascular Space: Possible anatomical substrate for the meridian. Journal of Complementary and Alternative Medicine. 9:6 (2003) pp851–859
Wang, Mu. Foundations of Internal Alchemy: The Taoist Practice of Neidan. Golden Elixir Press, 2011. .
 Wile, Douglas Lost T'ai-chi Classics from the late Ch'ing Dynasty (1996) State University of New York Press, Albany. 

Chinese martial arts terminology
Traditional Chinese medicine
Chinese words and phrases
Taoist philosophy